Octadepsipeptide may refer to:

 Emodepside
 Anthelmintic